Genetic conservation may refer to:

 Conserved sequences, DNA or protein sequences that are conserved over evolutionary time
 Conservation genetics, the field of science concerned with maintaining genetic diversity